The Americas Zone was one of the three zones of the regional Davis Cup competition in 1993.

In the Americas Zone there were three different tiers, called groups, in which teams compete against each other to advance to the upper tier. Winners in Group II advanced to the Americas Zone Group I. Teams who lost their respective ties competed in the relegation play-offs, with winning teams remaining in Group II, whereas teams who lost their play-offs were relegated to the Americas Zone Group III in 1994.

Participating nations

Draw 

 and  relegated to Group III in 1994.
 promoted to Group I in 1994.

First round

Dominican Republic vs. Paraguay

Peru vs. Colombia

Haiti vs. Puerto Rico

Ecuador vs. Venezuela

Second round

Peru vs. Paraguay

Ecuador vs. Puerto Rico

Relegation play-offs

Colombia vs. Dominican Republic

Venezuela vs. Haiti

Third round

Peru vs. Puerto Rico

References

External links
Davis Cup official website

Davis Cup Americas Zone
Americas Zone Group II